This list of tallest buildings in Kaohsiung ranks skyscrapers in the southern Taiwanese city of Kaohsiung, the third largest city in Taiwan, by height. The tallest building in Kaohsiung is currently the 85–story 85 Sky Tower, which rises , including its antenna, and was completed in 1997. It is also the second tallest building in Taiwan.

Most of the tallest buildings in Kaohsiung were completed in 1990s at the time Kaohsiung's local economy reached a peak. Entering 2000s, many proposed plans were suspended as a result of the continuing economic downturn in southern Taiwan.

Overview 

Located at the heart of the Asia-Pacific transportation hub, Kaohsiung has a world-class international port and Taiwan's largest deep-water port. In the 1990s, the Kaohsiung Harbor was once the world's third largest integrated port by cargo throughput (it is now currently the 13th in the world), second only to that of New York and Rotterdam. The Kaohsiung Harbor was important in the development of Taiwan's basic industry and helped the rapid increase in the Taiwanese economy in the 1960s. Its landmark skyscrapers also directly witnessed Taiwan’s economic peak in the 1990s, which led to the first wave of skyscraper construction. Amongst them, the 85 Sky Tower has created many unprecedented innovations in Taiwan at that time. In the later period, with the decline of Taiwan's economy and competition from other Asian ports located in emerging countries, the Kaohsiung economy has turned from prosperity to decline. Thus, the construction of skyscrapers in Kaohsiung has gradually receded, and many of the buildings in the project have been put on hold. After 2013, with the implementation of Kaohsiung's public construction and policies, the trend of skyscraper construction has gradually recovered. Some of the planned buildings that have been put on hold have also been relaunched. More than 100 buildings exceeding 100 meters have been completed. The tallest buildings are mostly concentrated in downtown Kaohsiung, which was the original Kaohsiung city before it was merged with Kaohsiung County in 2010.

Cityscape

Tallest Buildings in Kaohsiung 

An equal sign (=) following a rank indicates the same height between two or more buildings. The "Year" column indicates the year of completion. The list includes only habitable buildings, as opposed to structures such as observation towers, radio masts, transmission towers and chimneys.

Tallest Buildings under construction

Gallery

See also
 Skyscraper
 List of tallest buildings
 List of tallest buildings in Taiwan
 List of tallest buildings in New Taipei City
 List of tallest buildings in Taichung
 List of tallest buildings in Taipei

References

External links 
 Tallest buildings in Kaohsiung on Emporis
 Tallest Buildings in Kaohsiung on The Skyscraper Center
 Tallest Buildings in Kaohsiung on The SkyscraperPage.com

Buildings and structures in Kaohsiung

Kaohsiung